The Muras are an indigenous people who live in the central and eastern parts of Amazonas, Brazil, along the Amazon river from the Madeira to the Purus. They played an important part in Brazilian history during colonial times and were known for their quiet determination and subsequent resistance to the encroaching Portuguese culture.  Formerly a powerful people, they were defeated by their neighbors, the Munduruku, in 1788.

Of the original diversity of Muran languages, only Pirahã survives today.

Historical encounter with the Portuguese
According to Adélia Engrácia de Oliveira in Autos da devassa contra os índios Mura do Rio Madeira e nações do Rio Tocantins (1738–1739) (CEDEAM, 1986:1): "It is known that they, who used their canoes as homes, nomadic indians ("Índios de Corso"), controlled a wide area of land from the border of Peru to River Trombetas, that they stood out for their great effort to repel the encroaching of the Portuguese, that they were valiant and fearless warriors, using special attack tactics, and that their incursions and raids frightened 18th century Amazonas."

Territory

There are about 15,713 Mura people in Brazil.
About 587 of them occupy the Cunhã-Sapucaia Indigenous Territory along the Igapó-Açu River, which runs through the territory from west to east.
The lower part of the Matupiri River enters the territory, where it flows into the Igapó-Açu River.
The Matupi provides the main way to access the Matupiri State Park.
In an unusual arrangement, the Mura people have an "indigenous special use zone" in the state park that allows them to continue to fish and extract forest products, as they have for many generations.

References

Sources

Indigenous peoples in Brazil
Indigenous peoples of the Amazon